David Arthur "Finky" Strong (1916 – March 25, 1993) was an American football player, coach of football and basketball, and college athletics administrator.  He served as the head football coach at the South Dakota School of Mines and Technology (1941), Albright College (1946), Whitman College (1947–1948), and California State University, Sacramento (1954–1956).  He was the head basketball coach at South Dakota Mines for one season in 1941–42.  While at Whitman, he also served as the school's athletic director.

Strong was born in Mount Vernon, Washington.  He spent his childhood in Seattle, Spokane, Washington, Yakima, Washington, and Helena, Montana.  He played college football at the University of Illinois at Urbana–Champaign and the University of Michigan. Strong died from a heart attack while playing tennis in 1993.

Head coaching record

Football

References

External links
 1945 profile on Strong
 

1916 births
1993 deaths
American football halfbacks
American football quarterbacks
Albright Lions football coaches
Illinois Fighting Illini football players
Michigan Wolverines football players
Nebraska Cornhuskers football coaches
South Dakota Mines Hardrockers football coaches
South Dakota Mines Hardrockers men's basketball coaches
Sacramento State Hornets football coaches
UCLA Bruins football coaches
Texas Longhorns football coaches
Whitman Blues athletic directors
Whitman Fighting Missionaries football coaches
Sportspeople from Helena, Montana
People from Mount Vernon, Washington
Sportspeople from Yakima, Washington
Players of American football from Montana
Players of American football from Seattle
Players of American football from Spokane, Washington